Svetoslav Ivanov (Bulgarian: Светослав Иванов) is a Bulgarian journalist, for bTV. Svetoslav Ivanov is a presenter of the current affairs show "120 minutes" on bTV and recognized as the author of some of the most meaningful Bulgarian journalistic works for Middle East countries like Iraq, Afghanistan, Iran, Libya, Palestine, Israel, Lebanon etc.

Biography 
Svetoslav Ivanov is born on 30 November 1983 in Sofia. He graduates Journalism at the Sofia University. He specializes in the United Nations in New York and Geneva in 2012.
His career as a journalist starts with the Bulgarian Darik Radio where he is reporter and a presenter. In 2007 he joins the team of bTV. He is author to dozens of documentaries, interviews and reports from the most turbulent areas around the globe. In 2014 he debuts as the presenter to 120 Minutes, the same day his wife gives birth to their daughter. In his studio he often meets worldwide renowned politicians, intellectuals and public figures like Cecilia Attias, Lech Wałęsa, Viktor Yushchenko, Ahmet Davutoğlu, former CIA Director James Hulsy, former KGB agent Mikhail Lyubimov, Ribal al-Assad, Richard Branson, Jordan Belfort and others.
Articles of Svetoslav Ivanov have been posted in some of the most authoritative print issues, one of which the British newspaper "The Independent".
In 2010 together with the camera operator Valentin Vasilev they film the operation of the Israeli special ops against the "Gaza Freedom Flotilla"- a group of six ships situated 80 miles from the coast of Gaza. The reporters are situated on the Greek ship "Sfendoni" that is sailing right after the Turkish "Mavi Marmara" on the board of which eight people find their death.
Svetoslav Ivanov and Valentin Vasilev are held along with 60 other journalists from around the world and are returned to their countries. The incident evokes a major international scandal and parallel investigations from the European Union and the UN. This case has been described in detail in the chapter "Bloody night in the Mediterranean" from the first book of Svetoslav Ivanov- "Where the trees died" (2015) that includes travel history from the hottest points around the globe. The book rates as one of the bestsellers in Bulgaria for 2015.
The second book of Svetoslav Ivanov –"Monsters and Buddhists" (2017) – compiles 75 commentaries of his mini rubric in which in the beginning of every show he gives a commentary on the most popular issues of the week.

Gaza Flotilla
He covered the Gaza flotilla raid, with cameraman, Valentiv Vassilev.
The ship was huge. It had 540 Turkish passengers on board. The captains decided before the beginning of the trip that it would lead the flotilla. I have some of the attack on film with Valentin having just about a minute to do whatever he could in the dark” Ivanov said, adding warnings on the radio started as early as 10 pm Sunday.

We were all gathered inside the captain's cabin – journalists and many American citizens, some were pro-Palestinian activists, others - totally independent people, who were just curious what will happen,  I cannot say this was organized provocation, but the conditions for all this to occur were right there – it was like – let's try to pass the blockade, and if we don't succeed, let's at least make headlines. But no one expected the toll that ended up being paid by the Turkish ship.

He was detained and held at Beer Sheva detention center.
He was contacted by Bulgarian diplomats in Tel Aviv. He was deported and returned to Sofia.

The Bulgarian Parliamentary Committee for Foreign Policy joined the UN and the EU in requesting an independent investigation.

This case has been described in detail in the chapter "Bloody night in the Mediterranean" from the first book of Svetoslav Ivanov- "Where the trees died" (2015) that includes travel history from the hottest points around the globe. The book rates as one of the bestsellers in Bulgaria for 2015.

Awards
 (2008) "Robert Schuman" award of the European Commission for the investigation "Crescent in the Crown" for the Islamic movements in London.
 (2008, 2009, 2012) Three times awarded "Reporter of the year" from his colleagues in bTV.
 (2006) "Golden feather" Award of the Union of Bulgarian Journalists (UBJ) for contribution to the broadcast journalism.

References

Bulgarian journalists
Living people
1983 births